Soehrensia is a large genus of cacti native to South America.

It is found in Peru, Bolivia, Chile, Paraguay and northern Argentina.

Taxonomy
The genus was circumscribed by Curt Backeberg in Blätt. Kakteenf. vol.5 (6) on page 7 in 1938.

The genus name of Soehrensia is in honour of Johannes Soehrens (he died 1934), who was a Dutch botanist and Professor and Director of the Botanical Garden in Santiago de Chile, he was an authority on cacti. 

Studies in the 1970s and 1980s resulted in several formerly separate genera being absorbed into Echinopsis, including Soehrensia and Helianthocereus. Until it was re-assessed to be a separate genus.

Species
As accepted by Plants of the World Online;

References

Bibliography
 Edward F. Anderson, The Cactus Family (Timber Press, 2001) , pp. 255–286

External links

Cacti of South America
Cactoideae genera